6/45 may refer to:

 6/45 (film), a 2022 South Korean film
 Mega Lotto 6/45, a lottery in the Philippines